Platylesches batangae, the Batanga hopper, is a butterfly in the family Hesperiidae. It is found in Senegal, the Gambia, Guinea, Sierra Leone, Ivory Coast, Cameroon, Angola, the central part of the Democratic Republic of the Congo, Zambia and possibly Nigeria.

The larvae feed on Parinari congensis and Parinari polyandra.

References

Butterflies described in 1894
Erionotini
Butterflies of Africa